Maltby is a village and civil parish in the borough of Stockton-on-Tees and ceremonial county of North Yorkshire, England. It is located to the east of the A19. The population of the civil parish taken at the 2011 census was 293.

Amenities 
Maltby has a number of local amenities serving the village including a small methodist chapel and a cricket club, and 'Chadwicks' a 19th-century public house, which was originally called the Half Moon Inn, and The Pathfinders.

Ingleby Manor development
Since 2015 Maltby has expanded significantly due to the construction of 350 homes on the parish's western edge, adjacent to Maltby cricket ground. The development includes Maltby's secondary school.

Education

Ingleby Manor

Ingleby Manor Free School is an academy and sixth form operated by Delta Academies Trust. Ingleby Manor Free School was established in 2014, with an initial intake of approximately 80 year 7 pupils. It initially operated from a converted warehouse, before relocating to a new purpose-built site in 2016.

Administration
The village is part of the Stockton South parliamentary constituency, represented since the 2019 general election by Matt Vickers of the Conservative Party. The constituency was previously represented by Labour MP Paul Williams (2017-2019), James Wharton (Conservative, 2010–2017), and before that by Dari Taylor (Labour, 1997–2010).

Locally it has its own parish council, and is represented on Stockton Council as part of the Ingleby Barwick East ward, along with neighbouring Hilton village and its parish.

References

External links

Villages in North Yorkshire
Civil parishes in North Yorkshire
Borough of Stockton-on-Tees
Places in the Tees Valley